Park Young-Dae (born June 9, 1964) is a male South Korean former handball player who competed in the 1984 Summer Olympics and in the 1988 Summer Olympics.

In 1984 he was a member of the South Korean team which finished eleventh in the Olympic tournament. He played all six matches and scored one goal.

Four years later he won the silver medal with the South Korean team in the 1988 Olympic tournament. He played all six matches and scored one goal again.

External links
profile

1964 births
Living people
South Korean male handball players
Olympic handball players of South Korea
Handball players at the 1984 Summer Olympics
Handball players at the 1988 Summer Olympics
Olympic silver medalists for South Korea
Olympic medalists in handball
Asian Games medalists in handball
Handball players at the 1986 Asian Games
Medalists at the 1988 Summer Olympics
Asian Games gold medalists for South Korea
Medalists at the 1986 Asian Games
20th-century South Korean people